HMS Alacrity was a Type 21 frigate of the Royal Navy.

Alacrity was active during the Falklands War of 1982, where she sank a supply ship, survived Exocet-missile attacks and rescued men from the Atlantic Conveyor.  She was transferred to Pakistan on 1 March 1994 and renamed PNS Badr.

Background
Built by Yarrow Shipbuilders Ltd, Glasgow, Scotland, she was completed with Exocet launchers in 'B' position.

Royal Navy service

1977–1981
In 1977, Alacrity took part in the Fleet Review, of the Royal Navy at Spithead in celebration of HM the Queen's Silver Jubilee.
In 1980, "Alacrity" took part in a Far-East deployment.  During a visit to Shanghai she was the first British warship to enter the Yangtse river since HMS Amethyst escaped in 1949.

Falklands War
Alacrity participated in the Falklands War, departing Devonport on 5 April 1982 and captained by Commander Christopher Craig.

Alacrity was slightly damaged by an Argentine bomb on 1 May 1982.

On the night of 10–11 May 1982 Alacrity was tasked to establish if the Argentines had mined the north entrance of Falkland Sound. While approaching Swan Islands, she engaged and sank the 3000 ton Argentine supply ship ARA Isla de los Estados with her 4.5-inch gun.  The Argentine transport blew up after a hit ignited her cargo of jet fuel and ammunition. Fifteen crew members and seven servicemen (from all three armed forces and the coast guard) were killed, there were only two survivors.

As Alacrity left the channel just before dawn, her sister ship  was waiting to accompany her back to the Task Force, when the Argentine submarine,  Captained by Fernando Azcueta fired two SST-4 torpedoes at a range of 5000 yards.  One didn't leave its tube, the other missed and was heard to detonate after hitting the sea bottom.

1982–1994
As with the other surviving Type 21 frigates, Alacrity was suffering from cracking in her hull by the mid-1980s. She was taken in for refitting, and a steel plate was welded down each side of the ship.

In 1989, while deployed as West Indies guard ship, Alacrity was tasked for humanitarian relief on the island of Montserrat in the British West Indies after the island suffered devastation in the wake of Hurricane Hugo. The ship's Lynx helicopter was the sole means of transporting aid ashore as the port was destroyed.

Pakistan Navy service

Alacrity was decommissioned and transferred to Pakistan on 1 March 1994, being renamed Badr. Exocet was not transferred to Pakistan and Badr had her obsolete Sea Cat launcher removed and replaced with a Phalanx CIWS. Signaal DA08 air search radar replaced the Type 992 and SRBOC chaff launchers and new 20 mm and additional 30 mm guns were fitted.

Between 11 and 21 May 2008, Badr participated in Exercise Inspired Union, a multi-national exercises in the North Arabian Sea.

Badr was decommissioned in April 2013 by the Pakistan Navy.

References

Publications

 

Type 21 frigates
Falklands War naval ships of the United Kingdom
1974 ships